Onerahi, for half a century known as Grahamtown, is a seaside suburb of Whangārei, New Zealand's northernmost city. It is the city's only seaside suburb. It is located 9 km south-east of the centre of Whangārei and is principally a peninsula in the Whangārei Harbour, which empties into the Pacific Ocean.

The New Zealand Ministry for Culture and Heritage gives a translation of "long beach" for Onerahi.

The suburb's main feature is Whangarei Airport, located on the large flat area at the southern end of the suburb, which was built up using material from the site of a former Māori pā (fortress) just to the north.

There are two concentric roads around the seaward plateau; the upper one surrounds the airport, and the lower follows the coast.
The suburb is connected to Whangarei via the Onerahi Causeway.

Close to the suburb in the harbour is Motu Matakohe or Limestone Island, now being managed to restore its ecosystems. Public transport in Onerahi solely consists of bus services, the suburb is serviced by Citylink route 2 bus via Riverside Drive to Whangarei City.

History

The land for the town was purchased by Henry Walton and William Smellie Graham from Te Tirarau in the mid-1860s. It was then called Kaiwaka Point, but they renamed it Grahamtown. In 1912 it was renamed again to Onerahi ( – which means "beach" and  – which can be translated to mean "long and wide") to prevent a conflict with Grahamstown in the Coromandel.

From 1911 to 1933, Onerahi was also served by a branch line railway from the North Auckland Line known as the Onerahi Branch.  It was built to provide access to a wharf in Onerahi and when coastal shipping declined severely in the 1930s, the railway was closed.  Part of its formation has been retained as a walking track.

Whangarei Airport was established in May 1939 as an RNZAF training base. It was later converted to civilian use with commercial flights commencing in 1947, and has served the Whangarei District since.

Demographics

Onerahi had a population of 6,498 at the 2018 New Zealand census, an increase of 708 people (12.2%) since the 2013 census, and an increase of 756 people (13.2%) since the 2006 census. There were 2,433 households, comprising 3,063 males and 3,438 females, giving a sex ratio of 0.89 males per female, with 1,344 people (20.7%) aged under 15 years, 1,164 (17.9%) aged 15 to 29, 2,631 (40.5%) aged 30 to 64, and 1,353 (20.8%) aged 65 or older.

Ethnicities were 76.3% European/Pākehā, 30.1% Māori, 4.2% Pacific peoples, 4.2% Asian, and 2.0% other ethnicities. People may identify with more than one ethnicity.

The percentage of people born overseas was 18.1, compared with 27.1% nationally.

Although some people chose not to answer the census's question about religious affiliation, 50.9% had no religion, 34.9% were Christian, 3.1% had Māori religious beliefs, 1.1% were Hindu, 0.1% were Muslim, 0.6% were Buddhist and 2.0% had other religions.

Of those at least 15 years old, 834 (16.2%) people had a bachelor's or higher degree, and 1,032 (20.0%) people had no formal qualifications. 546 people (10.6%) earned over $70,000 compared to 17.2% nationally. The employment status of those at least 15 was that 2,253 (43.7%) people were employed full-time, 705 (13.7%) were part-time, and 273 (5.3%) were unemployed.

Education

Both schools are coeducational.

Sport 

The Onerahi Central Cricket Club celebrated their 50th anniversary in 2006, highlighted by a re-run of their first game against Whangarei Boys' High School with best-of selections.

Notes

External links
 Onerahi School website
 Onerahi Centrals Cricket Club details at ResultsVault

Populated places in the Northland Region
Suburbs of Whangārei